Piraino (Sicilian: Piràinu) is a comune (municipality) in the Metropolitan City of Messina in the Italian region Sicily, located about  east of Palermo and about  west of Messina.

The municipality of Piraino contains the frazioni (subdivisions, mainly villages and hamlets) Calanovella, Fiumara, Gliaca, Lacco, Leomandri, Merca, S.Arcangelo, S.Biagio, S.Costantino, S.Ignazio, S.Leonardo, Salinà, and Zappardino.

Piraino borders the following municipalities: Sant'Angelo di Brolo, Brolo, Gioiosa Marea.

References

External links

 Official website

Cities and towns in Sicily